Margaret Pieroni is a Western Australian botanical artist and botanist who has authored, co-authored and/or illustrated many books on Australian botany, including Brush with Gondwana: Botanical Artists Group of Western Australia (2008), The Dryandras (2006), Verticordia: the turner of hearts (2002), Discovering the wildflowers of Western Australia  (1993), Exploring granite outcrops (1990) and Leaf and branch: trees and tall shrubs of Perth (1990). Pieroni is also recognised for a significant contribution to specimen collection and horticultural research into dryandras, series Banksia ser. Dryandra, formerly regarded as genus Dryandra.

Selected works

Further reading
 

Botanical illustrators
Botanical collectors active in Australia
Living people
Year of birth missing (living people)